Pier Luigi Basso (born December 15, 1997) is an Italian chess grandmaster. He became a FIDE master (FM) in 2013 and an international master (IM) in 2016. He received the grandmaster (GM) title in 2018.

Notable Tournaments

References 

Living people
1997 births
Chess grandmasters
Chess arbiters
Italian chess players